The Exorcist is an American media franchise that originated with William Peter Blatty's 1971 horror novel of the same name and most prominently featured in a 1973 film adaptation of the novel, and many subsequent prequels and sequels. All of these installments focus on fictional accounts of people possessed by Pazuzu, the main antagonist of the series, and the efforts of religious authorities to counter this possession.

The films have grossed over $661 million at the worldwide box office and the novel has sold over 13 million copies. 20th Century Fox Television developed a 2016 television series as a continuation of the 1973 film, to generally positive reviews. As of 2020, a reboot of the film series which was later changed to a direct sequel to the 1973 film is in development with David Gordon Green as director. The film is scheduled to be released by Universal Pictures on October 13, 2023.

Novels

The Exorcist (1971)

The Exorcist is a 1971 novel by American writer William Peter Blatty. The book details the demonic possession of twelve-year-old Regan MacNeil, the daughter of a famous actress, and the two priests who attempt to exorcise the demon. It was published by Harper & Row.

The novel was inspired by a 1949 case of demonic possession and exorcism that Blatty heard about while he was a student in the class of 1950 at Georgetown University. As a result, the novel takes place in Washington D.C. near the campus of Georgetown University. In September 2011, the novel was reprinted by HarperCollins to celebrate its 40th anniversary, with slight revisions made by Blatty as well as interior title artwork by Jeremy Caniglia.

Legion (1983)

Legion is the 1983 follow-up to the Exorcist novel. It was made into the movie The Exorcist III in 1990. Like The Exorcist, it involves demonic possession. The book was the focus of a court case over its exclusion from The New York Times Best Seller list.

Blatty based aspects of the Gemini Killer on the real-life Zodiac Killer, who, in a January 1974 letter to the San Francisco Chronicle, had praised the original Exorcist film as "the best satirical comedy that I have ever seen".

Exorcist: The Beginning (2004)
A novelization of the film of the same name. Written by Steven Piziks, it was released by Pocket Star on October 4, 2004.

Films

The Exorcist (1973)

The Exorcist is a 1973 American supernatural horror film directed by William Friedkin, adapted by William Peter Blatty from his 1971 novel of the same name, and starring Ellen Burstyn, Linda Blair, Max von Sydow, and Jason Miller.

The book, inspired by the 1949 exorcism of Roland Doe, deals with the demonic possession of a 12-year-old girl and her mother's attempts to win back her child through an exorcism conducted by two priests. The adaptation is faithful to the book, which itself has been commercially successful (appearing on the New York Times bestseller list).

Exorcist II: The Heretic (1977)

John Boorman's Exorcist II: The Heretic was released in 1977, and revisited Regan four years after her initial ordeal. The plot centers on Father Philip Lamont (Richard Burton), who is struggling with his faith, as he is assigned by the Cardinal (Paul Henreid) to investigate the death of Father Lankester Merrin (Max von Sydow). Merrin was killed during The Exorcist as he performed the titular exorcism of Regan MacNeil (Linda Blair). In flashback sequences, Regan gives Merrin his fatal heart attack, as well as scenes from the exorcism of a young boy named Kokumo in Africa many years earlier. The Cardinal informs Lamont (who has had some experience at exorcism, and has been exposed to Merrin's teachings) that Merrin is being investigated posthumously for heresy. Despite approval for the MacNeil exorcism by a bishop, the Church is no longer convinced that MacNeil was truly possessed, and the controversial nature of Merrin's books on the subject are being reconsidered as politically and theologically suspect.

The Exorcist III (1990)

Adapted and directed by Blatty from his 1983 novel Legion, the film stars George C. Scott and several cast members (Jason Miller (reprising his Academy Award-nominated role from The Exorcist), Ed Flanders, Scott Wilson and George DiCenzo) from Blatty's previous film The Ninth Configuration. The film's continuity completely ignores the events of Exorcist II. The story takes place 15 years after the events of The Exorcist and turns a supporting character from the first film (philosophical police detective William F. Kinderman (Scott)) into the main protagonist. He investigates a series of brutal murders in Georgetown that resemble the modus operandi of a serial killer executed about the time of the MacNeil exorcism.

Originally titled Legion, the film was drastically changed after rewrites and re-shoots ordered by the studio Morgan Creek Productions. Studio executives demanded the addition of an exorcism sequence and retitled the film as The Exorcist III in order to more strongly tie the film to the rest of the franchise. All of the deleted footage is apparently lost.

Despite his misgivings about the studio-imposed reshoots, Blatty is proud of the finished version of The Exorcist III, having said: "It's still a superior film. And in my opinion, and excuse me if I utter heresy here, but for me, it's a more frightening film than The Exorcist". Nevertheless, Blatty had hoped to recover the deleted footage from the Morgan Creek vaults so that he might re-assemble the original cut of the film which he said was "rather different" from what was released, and a version of the film fans of the Exorcist series had been requesting. In 2007, Blatty's wife reported on a fan site that "my husband tells me that it is Morgan Creek's claim that they have lost all the footage, including an alternate opening scene in which Kinderman views the body of Karras in the morgue, right after his fall down the steps". According to Mark Kermode, the search for the missing footage is "ongoing".

Exorcist: The Beginning (2004)

Because of the studio's dissatisfaction with Schrader's version of the prequel (see below section Dominion: Prequel to the Exorcist), Renny Harlin was hired as director to retool the movie. Harlin reused some of Schrader's footage but shot mostly new material to create a more conventional horror film. Harlin's new version Exorcist: The Beginning was released, but it was not well received.

The plot revolves around the crisis of faith suffered by Father Merrin (Stellan Skarsgård) following the horrific events he witnessed during World War II. After WWII, Merrin is an archaeologist in Cairo, when he is approached by a collector of antiquities who asks him to come to a British excavation in the Turkana region of Kenya. This dig is excavating a Christian Byzantine church from the 5th century—long before Christianity had reached that region. Further, the church is in perfect condition, as though it had been buried immediately after the construction was completed. Merrin is asked to participate in the dig and find an ancient relic hidden in the ruins before the British do. Merrin takes the job but soon discovers that all is not well—something evil lies in the church and is infecting the region. The local tribesman hired to dig refuse to enter the building, and there are stories of an epidemic that wiped out an entire village. However, when Merrin, growing suspicious of these rumors, digs up one of the graves of the supposed victims of this plague, he discovers it is empty. Meanwhile, the evil grows, turning people against each other and resulting in violence, atrocities, and more bloodshed.

Dominion: Prequel to the Exorcist (2005)

A prequel film attracted attention and controversy before its release in 2004; it went through a number of directorial and script changes, such that two versions were ultimately released. John Frankenheimer was originally hired as director for the project, but he withdrew before filming started due to health concerns. He died a month later. Paul Schrader then replaced him. Upon completion, the studio rejected Schrader's version as being too slow and hired another director to retool the movie. Nine months after the release of the retooled movie (see above section Exorcist: The Beginning), Schrader's original version, retitled Dominion: Prequel to the Exorcist, was given a small theatrical release.

Several years before the events in The Exorcist, the young Father Lankester Merrin (played by Skarsgård, who played the same part in the Exorcist: The Beginning) travels to East Africa. Merrin has taken a sabbatical from the Church and devoted himself to history and archaeology as he struggles with his shattered faith. He is haunted especially by an incident in a small village in occupied Holland during World War II, where he served as the parish priest. Near the end of the war, a sadistic Nazi SS commander, in retaliation for the murder of a German trooper, forces Merrin to participate in arbitrary executions in order to save a full village from slaughter. He meets up with a team of archaeologists, who are seeking to unearth a church that they believe has been buried for centuries. At first, Merrin resists the idea that supernatural forces are in play but eventually helps them, and the ensuing events result in an encounter with Pazuzu, the same demon referenced in The Exorcist.

Future

The Exorcist (2023) 

In August 2020, it was revealed that Morgan Creek Entertainment is developing a theatrical reboot of The Exorcist. In December, Blumhouse Productions and Morgan Creek changed the reboot to a "direct" sequel which will be directed by Halloween's director David Gordon Green. Jason Blum, David Robinson and James Robinson will produce. Though the film serves as a direct follow-up to the original, Green confirmed that each of the franchise installments are still canon to his new film.

In July 2021, it was revealed that a trilogy of sequels are in development with David Gordon Green attached as director on each film. Green and Peter Sattler would write the screenplay, from a story by Green, Scott Teems, and Danny McBride. Jason Blum will serve as producer, alongside James Robinson and David Robinson. Burstyn will reprise her role from the original film, with Leslie Odom Jr. co-starring. The projects will be joint-venture productions between Blumhouse Productions and Morgan Creek Entertainment, with Universal Pictures serving as distributing company. Universal collaborated with Peacock to purchase distribution rights for $400 million total. The second and third films of the trilogy are being optioned as Peacock exclusive films. Later that month, Linda Blair stated that she had not yet been contacted to reprise her role from the original film.

In June 2022, Burstyn stated that she has completed production for her part in the film, revealing that principal photography had commenced some time previous. The untitled sequel is scheduled to be released on October 13, 2023.

Untitled sequels
In July 2021 when a trilogy of Exorcist films was announced, two sequels were confirmed to be concurrently in development. David Gordon Green is slated to serve as director, while work on the scripts for the two additional movies is ongoing.

Television

The Exorcist (2016–2017)

In 2016, 20th Century Fox Television developed a television series of The Exorcist, designed as a continuation of the film. The premise was described as "a propulsive, serialized psychological thriller following two very different men tackling one family’s case of horrifying demonic possession, and confronting the face of true evil". Rupert Wyatt directed the pilot episode whilst Alfonso Herrera and Ben Daniels were cast as Father Tomas Ortega and Father Marcus Keane. Geena Davis was cast as Angela Rance in the pilot. The pilot was filmed in Chicago in early 2016. The series ran for two seasons, and was canceled by Fox in May 2018.

Storyline continuity

Cast and characters

Additional crew and production details

Reception

Box office and financial performance

Critical and public response

Accolades
The Exorcist was nominated for ten Academy Awards in 1974, winning two. It was the first horror film to be nominated for Best Picture. The film was also nominated for seven Golden Globes, winning four.

Others
American Film Institute recognition:
 100 Years... 100 Thrills#3
 100 Years... 100 Heroes and VillainsRegan MacNeilVillain #9

In 1991, The Exorcist III won a Saturn Award from the Academy of Science Fiction, Fantasy & Horror Films, USA, for Best Writing (William Peter Blatty) and was nominated for Best Supporting Actor (Brad Dourif) and Best Horror Film. However it was also nominated for Worst Actor (George C. Scott) at the Golden Raspberry Awards. In 2005, Exorcist: The Beginning was nominated for two Golden Raspberry Awards, Worst Director (Renny Harlin) and Worst Remake or Sequel.

Legacy
The success of The Exorcist inspired a string of possession-related films worldwide. The first was Beyond the Door, a 1974 Italian film with Juliet Mills as a woman possessed by the devil. It appeared in the U.S. one year later. In the same year of 1974, a Turkish film, Şeytan (Turkish for Satan; the original film was also shown with the same name), is an almost scene-for-scene remake of the original. In the same year in Germany, the exorcism-themed film Magdalena, vom Teufel besessen was released. In 1975, Britain released The Devil Within Her (also called I Don't Want to Be Born) with Joan Collins as an exotic dancer who gives birth to a demon-possessed child.

In 1987, Warner Bros. released an animated short starring Daffy Duck, entitled "Duxorcist" which was a parody of The Exorcist, in which a group of spirits possess a female duck. Daffy does eventually succeed in getting them out of the female character. Similarly, a blaxploitation film was released in 1974 titled Abby. While the films Şeytan and Magdalena, vom Teufel besessen were protected from prosecution due to the laws of their countries of origin, Abbys producers (filming in Louisiana) were sued by Warner. The film was pulled from theaters, but not before making $4 million at the box office.

A parody, Repossessed, was released the same year as The Exorcist III, with Blair lampooning the role she had played in the original. Another parody, was made in Italy by actor and comedian Ciccio Ingrassia in 1977, called L'esorciccio. The prologue for Scary Movie 2 was a short parody of several scenes from the original film.

Mexican comics Los Polivoces (The Multivoices), made a copy-parody, called El Exorcista. Eduardo Manzano incarned the "possession" and hard make-up was used. Flying clothes were used as "phantoms" and rotoscophy techniques make his bed fly.

A 1995 episode of The Simpsons (titled "Home Sweet Homediddly-Dum-Doodily") features Bart, Lisa, and Maggie getting put under the care of the Flanders family. After Lisa reveals that neither she, Bart nor Maggie is baptized, Ned decides to baptize them. On the way to the baptism, Maggie turns her head around in a way similar to Linda Blair in The Exorcist. It was also parodied in "Treehouse of Horror", "Treehouse of Horror XVI" and "Treehouse of Horror XXVIII". It was also parodied in "Fland Canyon".

In the episode of Gravity Falls "The Inconveniencing", Mabel twisting her head 180 degrees whilst being possessed by a ghost is a reference to a scene in The Exorcist, in which Pazuzu, possessing Regan MacNeil, turns its head 180 degrees.

In Bride of Chucky, when Chucky is on the bed his head turns all the way around just before killing Damien. Tiffany watches this in excitement.

A meta-reference to the film was made in an episode of Supernatural titled "The Usual Suspects". On the show, demons possessing humans is a common plot element; demons in the series are human souls corrupted by their time in Hell, lacking physical bodies of their own to interact with Earth. Linda Blair appeared in "The Usual Suspects" as a police detective, with protagonist Dean Winchester finding her character familiar and expressing a strange desire for pea soup at the episode's conclusion.

In Angel: Earthly Possessions, a spin-off comic story based on the TV series Angel, protagonist Angel finds himself dealing with a priest who performs exorcisms, but comes to realize that the priest is summoning the demons for him to exorcise in the first place. He also makes a note of The Exorcist film, noting that the vision it created of possession actually made things easier for possession demons by making it harder for humans to know what to expect from a possession.

In the animated Horror-comedy show Courage the Cowardly Dog, the episode "The Demon In The Mattress" is a direct spoof of the film, using several plot elements that was lifted straight from The Exorcist. In the episode, Muriel orders a comfy new mattress, not paying attention to the grotesque deliveryman nor the sinister horse-drawn carriage that had delivered it. Unaware of the demon in the mattress, she is later possessed by it when while she sleeps.

In the paranormal TV series Ghost Adventures, the producers visited the Exorcist House for their 100th episode of the series. In the episode, Zak Bagans, Nick Groff, and Aaron Goodwin visit the house to see that an exorcism occurred there in 1949. The episode has been announced as one of the scariest lockdowns since Bobby Mackeys.

The film was parodied in The Boondocks episode "Stinkmeaner Strikes Back" (season 2, episode 4).

The 2013 disaster comedy film This Is the End referred to the exorcism when Jonah Hill is possessed by a demon and Jay Baruchel performs an exorcism on by repeating lines from the film.

In 2014, British author Saurav Dutt released a book entitled Pazuzu Unbound, which is a book set in contemporary times, dealing with the demon Pazuzu but which does not deal with the original characters in the film and novel on which the book is inspired.

Home media
A limited-edition box set was released in 1998. It was limited to 50,000 copies, with available copies circulating around the Internet. There are two versions; a special edition VHS and a special edition DVD. The only difference between the two copies is the recording format.

On the DVD
 The original film with restored film and digitally remastered audio, with a 1.85:1 widescreen aspect ratio.
 An introduction by director William Friedkin.
 The 1998 BBC documentary. The Fear of God: The Making of "The Exorcist".
 2 audio commentaries.
 Interviews with the director and writer.
 Theatrical trailers and TV spots.

In the box
 A commemorative 52-page tribute book, covering highlights of the film's preparation, production, and release; features previously unreleased historical data and archival photographs.
 Limited edition soundtrack CD of the film's score, including the original (unused) soundtrack (Tubular Bells and Night of the Electric Insects omitted).
 8 lobby card reprints.
 Exclusive senitype film frame (magnification included).

Blu-ray
A Blu-ray edition features a new restoration, including both the 1973 theatrical version and the "version you've never seen" from 2000. It was released on October 5, 2010.

In preparation for the first film's 41st anniversary, the complete collection of the series was released as The Exorcist: The Complete Anthology containing all five films restored on Blu-ray in September 2014. The rest of the installments of the franchise were also given an individual release for the first time on Blu-ray with the exception of Dominion: Prequel to the Exorcist which can only be obtained on Blu-ray by purchasing the collection.

Cut scenes

The "spider-walk scene"
Contortionist Linda R. Hager was hired to perform the infamous "spider-walk scene" that was filmed on April 11, 1973. Friedkin deleted the scene just prior to the original December 26, 1973 release date because he felt it was ineffective technically. However, with advanced developments in digital media technology, Friedkin worked with CGI artists to make the scene look more convincing for the 2000 theatrically re-released version of The Exorcist: The Version You've Never Seen. Since the original release, myths and rumors still exist that a variety of spider-walk scenes were filmed despite Friedkin's insistence that no alternate version was ever shot.

In 1998, Warner Brothers re-released the digitally remastered DVD of The Exorcist: 25th Anniversary Special Edition. This DVD includes the special feature BBC documentary, The Fear of God: The Making of The Exorcist, highlighting the never-before-seen original non-bloody version of the spider-walk scene. The updated "bloody version" of the spider-walk scene appears in the 2000 re-release of The Exorcist: The Version You've Never Seen utilizing CGI technology to incorporate the special effect of blood pouring from Regan's mouth during this scene's finale.

Other media

Stage

In February 2008, American playwright John Pielmeier expressed his interest in adapting William Peter Blatty's novel of the same name into a play and soon met with Blatty. He then began working on a script for the play, in which the first draft was completed within ten days. The Exorcist first premiered at the Geffen Playhouse, Los Angeles in 2012.

Video game
A horror VR video game, called The Exorcist: Legion VR, was published on Steam, Oculus and PlayStation in 2018 and was based on the events of The Exorcist III.

Canceled projects
In November 2009, Blatty planned to direct a miniseries of The Exorcist.

In September 2015, Morgan Creek Productions was selling its library of films, while retaining remake and sequel rights to key properties, including The Exorcist. Rumors began circulating that the original film would be remade, which was later denied by Morgan Creek.

See also

 The Exorcist: Italian Style or L'esorciccio, a 1975 Italian comedy film that parodies the original 1973 film.
 Possessed, a TV movie claiming to follow the true accounts that inspired Blatty to write The Exorcist.
Exorcist (disambiguation)
Exorcism

References

External links

 Official site
 
 
 The Haunted Boy of Cottage City: The Cold Hard Facts Behind the Story That Inspired The Exorcist, by Mark Opsasnick
 Jason Miller Remembers The Exorcist

 
Horror mass media franchises
Demons in film
Religious horror films
Mass media franchises introduced in 1971
Films about exorcism
Catholic Church in popular culture